Kaveri may refer to:

People
 Kaveri (actress), South Indian actress
 Kaveri Jha (born 1980), Telugu and Hindi actress
 Kaveri Kaul,  film director
 Kaveri Nambisan, Indian novelist
 Kaveri Kachari, head of the women's wing of the banned outfit ULFA

Films

 Kaveri (1955 film), a 1955 Tamil-language film directed by D. Yoganand
 Kaveri (1975 film), a 1975 Kannada-language film directed by H. N. Reddy
 Kaveri (1986 film), a 1986 Malayalam-language film directed by Rajeevnath

Other uses
 Kaveri River, one of the major rivers of India
 Kaveri River (Madhya Pradesh), a smaller river in central India
 GTRE GTX-35VS Kaveri, a turbofan aircraft engine
 Kaveri palam, a bridge in Trichy, Tamil Nadu, India
 Kaveri Express, a daily train running between Mysore and Chennai in India
 Kaveri, a hardware platform from AMD featuring the Steamroller microarchitecture